Jeremy Theron McNichols (born December 26, 1995) is an American football running back for the Pittsburgh Steelers of the National Football League (NFL). He played college football at Boise State, and was drafted by the Tampa Bay Buccaneers in the fifth round of the 2017 NFL Draft. McNichols has also played for the San Francisco 49ers, Indianapolis Colts, Denver Broncos, Tennessee Titans, Chicago Bears, Jacksonville Jaguars, and Atlanta Falcons.

Early years
McNichols attended Lakewood High School in Lakewood, California before transferring to Santa Margarita Catholic High School in Rancho Santa Margarita, California for his senior year. As a youngster, McNichols and fellow NFL player John Ross played in Snoop Dogg's youth football league in Long Beach, California. He played running back and wide receiver in high school, and his versatility led to him earning the nickname "McWeapon". During his career he rushed for 877 yards with nine touchdowns and had 72 receptions for 934 yards and 10 touchdowns. He originally committed to the University of Utah to play college football but later changed to Boise State University.

College career
McNichols enrolled at Boise State in early August 2014 before the start of fall camp. Heading into the season, McNichols planned on being redshirted and sat out the first five games before the redshirt was pulled. McNichols ended up playing in nine games as a true freshman during the 2014 season. He rushed for 159 yards on 17 carries with a rushing touchdown and had 15 receptions for 155 yards and a touchdown. As a sophomore in 2015, he started 12 games, rushing for 1,337 yards on 240 carries and 20 touchdowns. He also had 460 receiving yards and six touchdowns on 51 receptions.

Professional career

Tampa Bay Buccaneers
McNichols was drafted by the Tampa Bay Buccaneers in the fifth round, 162nd overall, in the 2017 NFL Draft. He was the 17th running back selected in that year's draft. 
He exhibited maturity issues and inability to read defenses which was documented in the twelfth season of Hard Knocks and was released by the team on September 2, 2017.

San Francisco 49ers
On September 4, 2017, McNichols was signed to the San Francisco 49ers' practice squad. He was promoted to the active roster on November 29, 2017.

On September 1, 2018, McNichols was waived by the 49ers.

Indianapolis Colts
On September 3, 2018, McNichols was signed to the Indianapolis Colts' practice squad. He was released on September 13, 2018, but was re-signed five days later. He was promoted to the active roster on September 28, 2018, but was waived four days later.

Denver Broncos
On October 10, 2018, McNichols signed to the Denver Broncos practice squad.

Tennessee Titans
On December 3, 2018, McNichols was signed by the Tennessee Titans off the Broncos practice squad. He was waived on August 31, 2019.

Chicago Bears
On November 19, 2019, McNichols was signed to the Chicago Bears practice squad. He was waived on December 11.

Jacksonville Jaguars
On December 18, 2019, McNichols was signed to the Jacksonville Jaguars practice squad. He was promoted to the active roster on December 28, 2019.

On May 4, 2020, the Jaguars waived McNichols to make room for veteran running back Chris Thompson.

Tennessee Titans (second stint) 
McNichols had a tryout with the Tennessee Titans on August 23, 2020, and re-signed with the team three days later. He was waived on September 5, 2020, and signed to the practice squad the next day. After being elevated to the active roster for the first two games of the season, he was promoted to the active roster on September 23, 2020. In the Week 6 matchup against the Houston Texans, he accounted for more than 50 rushing yards in a dominant Titans performance, who had 601 offensive yards, most in franchise history. He finished the season playing in all 16 games as a backup to Derrick Henry recording 47 carries for 204 yards and one touchdown along with 12 receptions for 55 yards. During the playoffs, McNichols recorded one carry for four yards in the Titans 20–13 loss to the Baltimore Ravens in the wildcard round.

McNichols was waived by the Titans on January 8, 2022, a day before their final regular season game. He was re-signed to the practice squad on January 11.

Atlanta Falcons
On May 26, 2022, McNichols signed with the Atlanta Falcons. On June 16, 2022, McNichols was released by the Falcons.

Pittsburgh Steelers
On July 26, 2022, McNichols signed a one-year contract with the Pittsburgh Steelers. He was placed on injured reserve on August 3, 2022.

References

External links
Tennessee Titans bio
Boise State Broncos bio

1995 births
Living people
Players of American football from Long Beach, California
American football running backs
Boise State Broncos football players
Tampa Bay Buccaneers players
San Francisco 49ers players
Indianapolis Colts players
Denver Broncos players
Tennessee Titans players
Chicago Bears players
Jacksonville Jaguars players
Atlanta Falcons players
Pittsburgh Steelers players